This is a list of notable Grange Hall buildings, which are or were meeting places of The National Grange of the Order of Patrons of Husbandry.  There are over 60 such buildings which are historic and are listed on the U.S. National Register of Historic Places (NRHP).  The list also includes buildings, such as the U.S. National Historic Landmark Oliver H. Kelley Homestead, which were otherwise strongly associated with the Grange movement.  More complete lists of Grange buildings, historic or otherwise, in any particular area, can be derived using the National Grange's Find a Grange page.

For one state, "in 1870, the Vermont State Grange was organized at the Union Schoolhouse in St. Johnsbury.  By 1872 there were twelve subordinate granges throughout the State.   Like early farmers' clubs and societies, grange meetings were often held in public buildings dedicated to other uses such as schools, church vestries and town halls.  It was not until the 1890s, a time when the Grange was becoming politically active for the first time and experiencing a rapid growth in membership, that local granges began to build their own buildings."

in the United States 
''(by state, then city or town)

References

External links

Grange Halls - A Waymarking Category